Carlisle High School is a public high school in Carlisle, Ohio and is a part of the Carlisle Local Schools.

History
The school was originally located in two story building on the corner of Jamaica Road and Fairview Drive.  It is now at 250 Jamaica Road.  The former building was constructed in 1972 and was built for efficiency in climate control.  Earthen mounds surround the building, and the building is partially set in the ground.

A new school building opened in 2020, the original location was torn down that same year.

Academics
Carlisle is a member of the High Schools That Work Association, a group that helps secondary education institutions set goals for improvement.

Demographics
The demographic breakdown of the 451 students enrolled for the 2012–2013 school year was:
Male - 54.8%
Female - 45.2%
Asian/Pacific islander - 1.3%
Black - 1.1%
Hispanic - 1.8%
White - 93.6%
Multiracial - 2.2%

In addition, 35.7% of the students were eligible for free or reduced lunches.

References

External links
 
 Carlisle Local Schools

High schools in Warren County, Ohio
Public high schools in Ohio